Pak Kwang-Ryong (Hangul: 박광룡; born 27 September 1992) is a North Korean professional footballer who plays as a striker.

Club career 
Born in Pyongyang, Pak originally played for Kigwanch'a SC of Sinŭiju before joining FC Wil 1900 in Switzerland. However, Pak did not make any league appearences for them, because the club's quota of foreigner players had already been exhausted.

On 27 June 2011 it was announced that FC Basel had signed Pak a five-year deal with them. He joined Basel's first team during their 2011–12 season under head coach Thorsten Fink. In his very first test game against a district selection team from Miesbach, Pak scored four goals after coming on as a substitute at half time. To the beginning of their 2011–12 season season Pak was member of the Basel team that won the 2011 Uhrencup, beating both Hertha Berlin 3–0 and West Ham United 2–1 (here Pak scored the first goal of the match) to lead the table on goal difference above Young Boys. After playing in seven test games Pak played his domestic league debut for his new club in the away game in the Stadion Wankdorf on 16 July 2011 as Basel play a 1–1 draw with BSC Young Boys.

Because he was born in 1992 he was eligible to play for the newly formed Basel Under-19 team in the 2011–12 NextGen series. He scored his first goal for them during the team's first game against Tottenham Hotspur F.C. on 17 August 2011.

On 14 September 2011 Pak became the first North Korean to play in the 2011–12 UEFA Champions League campaign, coming on the field in the 92nd minute. On his 19th birthday, 27 September 2011, Pak came on as a substitute in the 81st minute of FC Basel's 3–3 away draw against Manchester United at Old Trafford in another UEFA Champions League match.

Pak scored his first competition goal for the team in an away game in the 2011–12 Swiss Cup on 17 September 2011. In fact he netted the first two goals as Basel won 4–0 against amateur club FC Eschenbach. At the end of the 2011–12 season he won the Double with his new club. They won the League Championship title with 20 points advantage. The team won the Swiss Cup, winning the final 4–2 in a penalty shootout against Luzern.

Pak could not gain a place in the first team during the 2012–13 season but played regularly in their U-21 side, scoring six goals in twelve appearences, during the first half of the season. On 11 January 2013, Basel announced that some of their youngsters would be loaned out to lower league clubs and Pak signed a deal with Bellinzona, so that he could gain playing experience in the Challenge League.

On 20 June 2013, Basel announced that they would loan Pak to the Liechtensteiner club Vaduz in the Swiss Challenge League, again so that he could gain more playing experience. However, following the transfer of Raúl Bobadilla to Augsburg, in the Bundesliga, and the injury to Marco Streller, Basel decided to recall the striker to their squad. Pak played just one more game for Basel before he was again loaned to Vaduz from January 2014 until the end of the season. Playing in all 18 games, he scored 9 goals and Vaduz finished the 2013–14 Swiss Challenge League season as winners and were promoted. Pak's loan was renewed for the following Swiss Super League season.

In February 2014, he was named North Korea's Male Footballer of the Year for 2013.

At the end of the 2014–15 season, Basel did not renew Pak's contract. During his time with Basel's first team, Pak
played a total of 42 games for Basel scoring a total of 10 goals. 14 of these games were in the Swiss Super League, three in the Swiss Cup, four in the UEFA competitions (Champions League and Europa League) and 21 were friendly games. He scored one goal in the domestic league, two in the cup and the other seven were scored during the test games.

On 1 July 2015, he joined Biel-Bienne as a free agent. On 4 January 2016, Biel-Bienne annulled their contract with Pak who then signed with Lausanne.

Career statistics

Club

International
Scores and results list North Korea's goal tally first.

Honours 
North Korea
 AFC Challenge Cup: 2010, 2012

Basel
 Swiss Super League: 2011–12
 Swiss Cup: 2011–12

 Vaduz
 Liechtenstein Cup: 2013–14
 Swiss Challenge League winner: 2013–14

References

External links 
  
 Pak Kwang-ryong profile on the Swiss Football League homepage
 
 

1992 births
Living people
Wolmido Sports Club players
FC Basel players
AC Bellinzona players
FC Vaduz players
FC Biel-Bienne players
FC Lausanne-Sport players
SKN St. Pölten players
Swiss Super League players
Swiss Challenge League players
Austrian Football Bundesliga players
North Korean expatriate footballers
Expatriate footballers in Switzerland
Expatriate footballers in Liechtenstein
North Korean expatriate sportspeople in Liechtenstein
North Korean expatriate sportspeople in Switzerland
Expatriate sportspeople in Liechtenstein
North Korean footballers
North Korea international footballers
Association football forwards
Asian Games medalists in football
Footballers at the 2010 Asian Games
Footballers at the 2014 Asian Games
2015 AFC Asian Cup players
2019 AFC Asian Cup players
Sportspeople from Pyongyang
Asian Games silver medalists for North Korea
Medalists at the 2014 Asian Games
North Korean expatriate sportspeople in Austria